Fan Wei is the name of:

Fan Wei (actor) (born 1962), Chinese actor 
Fan Wei (entrepreneur), Chinese entrepreneur, founder of Fosun International